Langsdorfia ornatus is a moth in the family Cossidae. It is found in Chile.

References

Natural History Museum Lepidoptera generic names catalog

Hypoptinae
Moths described in 1882
Endemic fauna of Chile